Kanchanaburi Rajabhat University (KRU) is a Thai public university under the Rajabhat University system. The campus is just outside Kanchanaburi, a small city west of Bangkok.

History
The university opened in the autumn of 1973 as Kanchanaburi Teachers Training College. In the 1990s, majors other than education were added and it became known as Rajabhat Institute Kanchanaburi. A few years later, the name was changed  by royal decree to Kanchanaburi Rajabhat University.

Location
Kanchanaburi Rajabhat University is near to the historic site, The Bridge over the River Kwai.

Faculties

Faculty of Education
The Faculty of Education is the oldest faculty at KRU.

Faculty of Science and Technology

Faculty of Social Science and Humanity

Business English Subjects

Mass Media One

Faculty of Management Technology

Faculty of Industrial Technology
The Faculty of Industrial Technology is the newest faculty in KRU. It grew from a department of the Faculty of Science and Technology. It is intended to educate people in practical science fields.

References

External links
 Kanchanaburi Rajabhat University web site in Thai

Kanchanaburi
Rajabhat University system
Universities in Thailand
Buildings and structures in Kanchanaburi province
Educational institutions established in 1973
1973 establishments in Thailand